"Caught Up in the Country" is a song recorded by American country music singer Rodney Atkins, featuring vocals from the Fisk Jubilee Singers. It was written by Connie Harrington, Jordan Schmidt, and Mike Walker, and was released in March 2018 on Curb Records. The song is the lead single and title track of his 2019 album of the same name.

Content
The song is an "upbeat salute to rural life", featuring vocals from the Fisk Jubilee Singers. Atkins aid that "It's organic and it's got a lof of energy...It represents what I've been caught up in."

Chart performance
For the week of April 13, 2018, the song debuted at number 59 on the Country Airplay chart. The song spent 57 weeks on the Country Airplay charts before achieving a peak of number 21, setting a new record for the longest chart run in that chart's history. This record has since been broken by Jimmie Allen's "Make Me Want To" (59 weeks) in March 2020. The same week it achieved this feat, it was certified gold by the Recording Industry Association of America (RIAA).

Weekly charts

Year-end charts

Certifications

References

2018 songs
2018 singles
Rodney Atkins songs
Curb Records singles
Songs written by Connie Harrington
Songs written by Jordan Schmidt
Vocal collaborations